Ateneo Blue Eagles basketball team is about the basketball teams of the Ateneo de Manila University.

The first women's varsity basketball team was formed in 1974. It joined the league called Women's National Collegiate Athletic Association (WNCAA) and was named the Blue Eaglettes. This was later changed to Lady Eagles when they transferred to the UAAP. No written article has been found to date to explain why and to provide the exact year this name change happened.

5-on-5 basketball 
Rivals
The Blue Eagles have had several rivalries throughout the years. Before the NCAA was founded and into the early years after its foundation (1924), Ateneo's fiercest basketball rivals were the UP Fighting Maroons (then known as the Maroon and Greens).

Championships 

In men's basketball, the Ateneo Blue Eagles have won 26 titles as of 2022, 14 in the NCAA and 12 in the UAAP. The Lady Eagles have won two UAAP titles.

Other Leagues and Tournaments 

The Blue Eagles also competed at the 2018 William Jones Cup, an international tournament in Taiwan for both club and national teams.

Year – Champions
 2005 – Lady Eagles – National Students Basketball Championships / Home and Away Invitational League
 2006 – Blue Eagles – Fr. Martin Summer Cup
 2007 – Blue Eagles – Collegiate Champions League
 2008 – Blue Eagles – Philippine University Games / Nike Summer League
 2009 – Blue Eagles – Philippine University Games / Philippine Collegiate Champions League
 2010 – Blue Eagles – Fr. Martin Summer Cup / Philippine Collegiate Champions League
 2011 – Blue Eagles – Philippine University Games / Filoil Flying V Preseason Cup

Notable players 
 
 Japeth Aguilar
 Rich Alvarez
 Rabeh Al-Hussaini
 Ford Arao
 Francis Arnaiz
 Nonoy Baclao
 Aaron Black
 Ryan Buenafe
 Paolo Bugia
 Bernardo Carpio
 Gec Chia
 Justin Chua
 Ricardo Cleofas
 Baby Dalupan
 Arthur dela Cruz
 Paquito Diaz
 Nico Elorde
 John Paul Erram
 Macky Escalona
 Larry Fonacier

 Isaac Go
 Frank Golla
 Wesley Gonzales
 Alfonzo Gotladera
 Vince Hizon
 JC Intal
 Padim Israel
 Robert Jaworski Jr.
 Angelo Kouame
 Doug Kramer
 Jojo Lastimosa
 Moro Lorenzo
 Honesto Mayoralgo
 Magnum Membrere
 Emman Monfort
 Chito Narvasa
 Ogie Narvasa
 Chris Newsome
 Ed Ocampo
 Ambrosio Padilla

 Von Pessumal
 Kris Porter
 Francisco Rabat 
 Olsen Racela
 Dwight Ramos
 Ning Ramos
 Kiefer Ravena
 Thirdy Ravena
 Chot Reyes
 Jai Reyes
 Jun Ross
 Nico Salva
 Marte Samson
 Greg Slaughter
 LA Tenorio
 Richie Ticzon
 Juami Tiongson
 Chris Tiu
 Arvin Tolentino
 Enrico Villanueva

3x3 Basketball 
Ateneo won the UAAP Season 81 3x3 Basketball tournament on its second and final year as a demonstration sport before it became an official sport in UAAP Season 82.

References 

Ateneo de Manila University
College sports teams in Metro Manila
University Athletic Association of the Philippines teams